Omphale is an opera by the French composer André Cardinal Destouches, first performed at the Académie Royale de Musique (the Paris Opera) on 10 November 1701. It takes the form of a tragédie en musique in a prologue and five acts. The libretto is by Antoine Houdar de La Motte.

Sources
  Libretto at "Livres baroques"
  Félix Clément and Pierre Larousse Dictionnaire des Opéras, Paris, 1881
 Viking Opera Guide, ed. Amanda Holden (Viking, 1993): article on Omphale, p.262

French-language operas
Tragédies en musique
1701 operas
Operas by André Cardinal Destouches
Operas
Opera world premieres at the Paris Opera